Monchegorsk Air Base is a military air base in Murmansk Oblast, Russia located 13 km northeast of Monchegorsk and 11 miles southwest of Olenya (air base).  Work on the air base began in the early 1950s, and by 1957 it was identified on American Lockheed U-2 overflights with a modern 6600 ft (2000 m) runway, extensive infrastructure, and a MiG regiment.

During the Cold War it hosted the 174th Guards Fighter Aviation Regiment (174 Gv IAP) flying the Yak-28P during the 1960s and 1970s, and a MiG-21R squadron in the 1970s which was upgraded to the Su-17M3 in the early 1980s.  It was also home to MiG-25PDS aircraft in the 1980s.  In the early 1980s MiG-31 interceptors were deployed to Monchegorsk. The base also hosted a reconnaissance regiment, the 98 ORAP (98th Separate Reconnaissance Aviation Regiment) flying MiG-25RB, Sukhoi Su-17, Sukhoi Su-24MR, and MiG-31 aircraft.

For much of the Cold War fighter regiments at the base were under control of Air Defence Corps of the 10th Air Defence Army.

The base is home to the 98th Guards Composite Aviation Regiment which uses the Sukhoi Su-24M/MR (NATO: Fencer), Mikoyan MiG-31BM (NATO: Foxhound) & Mil Mi-8MTV (NATO: Hip) along with 98th Guards Independent Composite Aviation Regiment of the Russian Navy.

Runway 
Monchegorsk has a runway of concrete in the direction 01/19 of 2,400x40 m. (7.873x131 feet).

Military operations 
May 20, 1966 in Monchegorsk was established the 67 separate air squadron composed of two aircraft early warning Tu-126 (NATO designation:  'Moss' ) equipping the radar system "Liana". The same year, November 10 the unit was moved to the city of Šiauliai, in Lithuania.

In the 1980s it was the headquarters of the regiment of intercept 174 Gv IAP, which used aircraft MiG-25PDS (NATO designation: 'Foxbat-E' ), during the 1980s and MiG-31 (NATO designation: 'Foxhound-A' )  during the 1990s. The regiment was dissolved on September 1, 2001. After the dissolution, the MiG-31 became part of the 458 regiment, stationed in the Kotlas air base, in the Arkhangelsk Oblast.

It also hosted the regiment of reconnaissance 98 ORAP flying MiG-25RB (NATO designation:  'Foxbat-B' ), Su-17 (designation NATO:  'Fitter-C' )  Su-24MR (NATO designation:  'Fencer-E' )  and MiG-31.

It is currently stationed at the 7000 air group aerodrome serving aircraft Su-24MR (NATO designation:  'Fencer-E' ), Su-24M (NATO designation:  'Fencer-D  ')  and helicopters Mi-8 (NATO designation:  'Hip  ').

References

Russian Air Force bases
Soviet Air Force bases
Soviet Air Defence Force bases
Airports in Murmansk Oblast
Installations of the Russian Navy